Secrets is a jazz-funk fusion album by keyboard player Herbie Hancock. It is also Hancock's seventeenth album overall. Participating musicians include saxophonist Bennie Maupin and guitarist Wah Wah Watson.

The album clearly followed from its predecessor Man-Child.  As ever, Paul Jackson's basslines were critical, and the other regular member Bennie Maupin continued to provide most of the solos alongside Hancock.  Man-Child had seen the addition of electric guitar to Hancock's sound, and Secrets saw the guitar's place in the arrangements rise to crucial importance throughout.  The flamboyant rhythm guitar contributions of top Motown session musician Wah Wah Watson are a particularly notable feature of the album.

Whereas Man-Child was evenly divided between up-tempo and laid-back tracks, Secrets emphasized the more mellow, softly rounded mood.  Even the more up-tempo tracks, "Doin' It" and "Cantelope Island" (a remake of Hancock's 1964 composition), are suffused with a relaxed Caribbean influence, and overall the album tends towards restrained, rolling grooves rather than overtly high-energy funk. Appropriately, Hancock spent much of his time using the mellow tones of the Fender Rhodes piano, and took advantage of new polyphonic synthesizers to contribute thick pads, foreshadowing ambient music.

Although summery and mellow, the album was far from lounge music, with some extremely abstract and intense sections, particular in the latter half; it is also entirely instrumental beside the "Jus' keep on doin' it" chants of the opening track.  Subsequent Hancock albums saw the addition of more vocoded lead vocals and disco influences.

The Secrets line-up performed "Spider" (from this LP) and "Hang Up Your Hang-Ups" (from Man-Child) at the V.S.O.P. concert in the summer of 1976.

Track listing
 "Doin' It"  (Melvin Ragin, Ray Parker Jr.) – 8:03
 "People Music"  (Herbie Hancock, Ragin, Paul Jackson) – 7:11
 "Cantelope Island"  (Hancock) – 7:06
 "Spider"  (Ragin, Hancock, Jackson) – 7:21
 "Gentle Thoughts"  (Hancock, Ragin) – 7:05
 "Swamp Rat"  (Jackson, Hancock, Ragin) – 6:26
 "Sansho Shima"  (Bennie Maupin) – 4:50

Personnel
James Gadson – drums on Doin' It
Herbie Hancock – acoustic piano, Rhodes electric piano, electric grand piano, ARP Odyssey, ARP String Ensemble, Hohner D6 Clavinet, Micromoog, Oberheim 4 Voice,  Echoplex
Bennie Maupin – soprano saxophone, tenor saxophone, saxello, lyricon, bass clarinet
Ray Parker Jr. – guitar, backing vocals on "Doin' It"
Paul Jackson – bass
James Levi – drums
Kenneth Nash – percussion, cuíca
Wah Wah Watson – guitar, Maestro universal synthesiser system / sample and hold unit, voice bag; vocals & bass on "Doin' It" Co-Producer.

References

1976 albums
Columbia Records albums
Herbie Hancock albums
Albums produced by Dave Rubinson
Albums recorded at Wally Heider Studios